Re Board of Commerce Act 1919 and the Combines and Fair Prices Act 1919, commonly known as the Board of Commerce case, is a Canadian constitutional decision of the Judicial Committee of the Privy Council in which the "emergency doctrine" under the federal power of peace, order and good government was first created.

Background

Following the end of the First World War, there was a rapid rise in the cost of living in the Canadian economy. In response, the Parliament of Canada passed the Board of Commerce Act, 1919 and the Combines and Fair Prices Act, 1919. The assigned the Board of Commerce two main functions:

 Investigate and restrain combinations, monopolies, trusts and mergers constituting a "combine."
Inquire into and enforce prohibitions against hoarding and profiteering.

In pursuit of its functions, the Board issued an order, prohibiting certain clothing manufacturers in Ottawa from charging higher than specified profit margins. That triggered a dispute as to the Acts' constitutionality, and the Board referred the matter to the Supreme Court of Canada by way of stated case under s. 32 of the Board of Commerce Act, posing the following reference questions:

Has the Board lawful authority to make the order?
Has the Board lawful authority to require the Registrar or other proper officer of the Supreme Court of Ontario to cause the order when issued to be made a rule of said Court?

Supreme Court of Canada

The Supreme Court split 3–3 on the question of the constitutionality of the legislation. Anglin J, joined by Davies CJ and Mignault J considered the Acts to be intra vires and repeated the observation he had previously made in the Insurance Act Reference:

However, given the Privy Council's rulings in Citizen's Insurance Co. v. Parsons and the Local Prohibition case, he rested his decision to uphold the Acts on the basis of the federal trade and commerce power as well as on the federal power relating to peace, order and good government.

Idington, Duff, and Brodeur JJ, in separate opinions, held that they were ultra vires. In particular, Duff J had concerns as to the interpretation of the nature of the power of peace, order and good government:

An appeal was then filed with the Privy Council.

Privy Council

Lord Haldane, for the Council, found that the Acts were ultra vires the jurisdiction of the Parliament of Canada, as they could not be justified under any heading of federal power enumerated in s. 91 of the British North America Act, 1867.

Peace, order and good government
Haldane rejected the general power of peace, order and good government on the basis that it should be used only in circumstances "such as those of war or famine [where] the peace, order, and good Government of the Dominion might be imperilled under conditions so exceptional that they require legislation of a character in reality beyond anything provided for by the enumerated heads in either section 92 or section 91 itself."

Trade and commerce
Citing his previous decision in John Deere v Wharton, Haldane held that the power to regulate trade and commerce was meaningless unless it could be said to supplement another federal power.

Criminal law
In explaining why the federal criminal law power was not of help in the matter, Haldane also provided its first definition in Canadian jurisprudence by stating that it would apply "where the subject matter is one which by its very nature belongs to the domain of criminal jurisprudence."

Aftermath
Haldane's statement as to the nature of the criminal law power was later described by Lord Atkin in Proprietary Articles Trade Association v. Attorney General of Canada as not being a definition. Instead, it was held to be "the criminal law in its widest sense," including the ability to make new crimes, and the only relevant standard to apply is whether the act would attract penal consequences. In addition, while the matter of the trade and commerce power did not need to be decided in that case, the Board declared that it wished to dissociate themselves from Haldane's previous comment: "No such restriction is properly to be inferred from that judgment."

References

Further reading
 

Canadian federalism case law
Judicial Committee of the Privy Council cases on appeal from Canada
1922 in Canadian case law